Syed Sabit Ali Shah(1740–1810) was a Sindhi language poet born in 1740 in Sehwan Sindh Kalhora Dynasty. His grandfather Syed Noor Muhammad Shah came from Central Asia and stayed in Thatta with Muhgal Nawab Azam. After Nawab Azam's Government coup his Grandfather Left Thatta,  and permanently settled in Sehwan, Sindh his father Syed Madar Ali Shah had three son and Syed Sabit Ali Shah one of them. Syed Sabit Ali Shah learnt early education from his teacher Akhund Abdul Rehman, when his teacher when Hejaz for Hajj then he started learning Quranic teaching from Mule Chaker, and Persian from Akhund Elyas  his first teacher in poetry was Makhdom Noor ul Haq Mushtaqi and in final with Main Sarfraz Khan Kalhoro become the pupil of Ghulam Ali Madah.

Poetry
In the final years of Kalhora Dynasty, and early Talpur Dynasty great changed occurred in Sindhi Poetry.in the wake of He was the first ever poet of Sindh who properly laid down the Elegy, in Sindhi language.and in elegy his first student was Mirza Murad Ali Baigh.
Actually Epic poetry started from Syed Sabit Ali Shah.

جڏھن علي اڪبر بہ ڪيو قتال ڪربلا،
شير جنگي جزم ڪيو عزم جدال ڪربلا،
شاھ سمجھو ان جي خاطر جو خيال ڪربلا 
ھٿ کڻي ڪئين عرض رب کي سرح حال ڪربلا
چيائين جا رب جي رضا اسين رضي آھيون با رضا
آئون بہ حاضر، پٽ بہ حاضر، قد رضينا بالقضا

Death
Syed Sabit Ali Shah died on 1810/1225 Hijri, and he was entombed in Sehwan, Sindh, where the great shrine was built on his grave.

References

1740 births
1810 deaths
Sindhi-language poets
1749 births